Miroslav Růžička (born 23 December 1959 in Chomutov) is a Czech sport shooter. He competed at the 1988 Summer Olympics in the men's 50 metre pistol event, in which he tied for 16th place, and the men's 10 metre air pistol event, in which he placed sixth.

References

1959 births
Living people
Sportspeople from Chomutov
ISSF pistol shooters
Czech male sport shooters
Shooters at the 1988 Summer Olympics
Olympic shooters of Czechoslovakia